Vernon is an unincorporated community in Madison County, Mississippi, United States.

References

Unincorporated communities in Madison County, Mississippi
Unincorporated communities in Mississippi